Chevak Cupʼik or just Cupʼik (and sometimes Cugtun) is a subdialect of Hooper Bay–Chevak dialect of Yupʼik spoken in southwestern Alaska in the Chevak (Cupʼik, Cevʼaq) by Chevak Cupʼik Eskimos (own name Cupʼit or Cevʼallrarmuit). The speakers of the Chevak subdialect used for themselves as Cupʼik (as opposed to Yupʼik), but the speakers of the Hooper Bay subdialect used for themselves as Yupʼik (not Cupʼik), as in the Yukon-Kuskokwim dialect.

The Central Alaskan Yupik who in the village of Chevak call themselves Cupʼik (plural Cupʼit), whereas those who live on Nunivak Island (Nuniwar in Nunivak Cupʼig, Nunivaaq in Central Yupʼik) call themselves Cupʼig (plural Cupʼit), the spelling differences serving as a self-designated cultural identifier between the two groups. In both dialects, the consonant Yupʼik c is pronounced as an English ch. The Cupʼik dialect is readily distinguished from other dialects of Yupʼik in the pronunciation of Yupʼik "y" sounds as "ch" sounds (represented by the letter "c"), and by some fundamental differences in the basic vocabulary.

The oldest fully bilingual person in Chevak is Leo Moses, born in 1933; there are few if any persons born after 1945 who do not speak English.

The first documentation of the Hooper Bay-Chevak dialect (beyond occasional citations) is found in the unpublished notes of Jesuit priests residing at Hooper Bay and Kashunuk in the 1920s and 1930s. Published recognition of Hooper Bay-Chevak as a morphologically distinct dialect of Yupʼik seems to begin with Michael E. Krauss in 1973, although the fundamental differences between the dialects were common knowledge among native speakers. Cup'ik is a critically threatened language, and English the primary language of everyday communication among most of those with knowledge of the language.

Education 

Their unique cultural and linguistic identity has allowed them to form a single-site school district, the Kashunamiut School District, rather than joining a neighboring Yupʼik school district. English and Cupʼik bilingual education is done at this school. There is a tri-language system in Chevak; English, Cupʼik, and a mixture of the two languages.

Before 1950 formal education for students in Chevak took place in the Qaygiq (semi-underground men's community house), and in the homes of the people.

Vocabulary comparison 
The comparison of some words in the two dialects.

Phonology 
There are 18 letters used in the Cupʼik alphabet: a c e g i k l m n p q r s t u v w y.

These letters are not used in the Cupʼik alphabet: b d f h j o x z.

Vowels:
Short vowels: a i u e
Long vowels: aa ii uu
Diphthongs:  ai ui au iu ua ia

Consonants:
Stops: p t c k q
Voiced fricatives: v l y g r w
Voiceless fricatives: vv ll ss gg rr ww
Voiced nasals: m  n  ng 
Voiceless nasals: m  n  ng

Russian loanwords 

The Russian loanwords used in Chevak Cupʼik date from the period of the Russian America (1733–1867).

caarralaq (< Rus. сахар) 'sugar'
caayuq  (< Rus. чай) 'tea'
caanik (< Rus. чайник) 'tea kettle'
capʼakiq ( < Rus. сапоги) 'shoe'
cassʼaq (< Rus. часы) 'clock'
culunaq (?< Rus. солонина 'salted meat') 'salted fish'
kalantaassaq (< Rus. карандаш) 'pencil'
kalmaaniq (< Rus. карман) 'pocket'
kelipaq (< Rus. хлеб) 'bread'
luussitaq (< Rus. лошадь) 'horse'
massʼlaq (< Rus. масло) 'butter; margarine'
missuulleq (< Rus. мешок) 'burlap sack'
mulukʼuuq (< Rus. молоко) 'milk'
multʼuuq (< Rus. молоток) 'hammer'
palʼtuuk (< Rus. пальто) 'coat; jacket'
pelatekaq (< Rus. палатка) 'tent'
putuskaq (< Rus. подушка) 'pillow'
spickaq : (< Rus. спичка) 'match'
tiititsaaq / tiissitsaaq (< Rus. тысяча) 'thousand; one thousand dollars'
yaassiik : (< Rus. ящик) 'box; cardboard box'

The names of days and months 

erneq day
Agayuneq ('praying') Sunday
Pekyun ('movement')  Monday
Aipirin ('next')  Tuesday
Pingayirin ('third')  Wednesday
Citamirin ('fourth')  Thursday
Tallimirin ('fifth')  Friday
Maqineq ('steambath')  Saturday
iraluq month
Agayuulek ('icicles') January
Nakrutlek ('accurate shooter') February
Neqlelek ('white front geese') March
Tunturalek ('reindeer') April
Cupun ('breaking river ice') May
Kaugun ('clubbing fish') June
Essgun ('newly hatched eggs') July
Putukuarun ('waddling ducks & geese') August
Amiirairun ('shedding') September
Cauyaun ('drumming') (in Chevak) / Ipukaqun (in Hooper Bay) October
Kanruyauciq ('frost') November
Angunquyugtuun ('big toe') December

See also 
Nunivak Cup'ig language
Alaska Native Language Center

References

External links 
Alaskool: Chevak Cupʼik Glossary
Alaskool: Guidebook for Integrating Cupʼik Culture and Curriculum
Kashunamiut School District
On the Facebook: Cupʼik Word Of The Day - Chevak by Rebecca Nayamin (Cupʼik Language Orthographist)

Indigenous languages of the United States
Yupik languages
Endangered Eskaleut languages